
Gmina Brzuze is a rural gmina (administrative district) in Rypin County, Kuyavian-Pomeranian Voivodeship, in north-central Poland.

Villages
Gmina Brzuze contains the villages and settlements of Brzuze, Dobre, Giżynek, Gulbiny, Kleszczyn, Łączonek, Marianowo, Mościska, Okonin, Ostrowite, Piskorczyn, Przyrowa, Radzynek, Somsiory, Trąbin-Rumunki, Trąbin-Wieś, Ugoszcz and Żałe.

Neighbouring gminas
Gmina Brzuze is bordered by the gminas of Chrostkowo, Radomin, Rogowo, Rypin, Wąpielsk and Zbójno.

References
Polish official population figures 2006

Brzuze
Rypin County